Alternating Currents is the ninth album by jazz fusion group Spyro Gyra, released in 1985. At Billboard magazine, it reached No. 66 on the Top 200 Albums chart, No. 41 on the R&B Albums chart, and No. 3 on the Jazz Albums chart.

Track listing 
 "Shakedown" (Jeremy Wall) – 4:22
 Alternating Currents" (Jay Beckenstein) – 4:28
 "Taking the Plunge (for Jennifer)" (Beckenstein) – 4:48
 "Binky Dream No. 6" (Beckenstein, Fernández, Morales, Schuman, Stone, Velez) – 4:13
 "PG" (Beckenstein) – 4:15
 "Heartbeat" (Wall) – 4:48
 "Mardi Gras" (Dave Samuels) – 6:04
 "I Believe in You" (Tom Schuman) – 5:31
 "Sunflurry" (Schuman) – 5:01

Personnel 
 Jay Beckenstein – saxophones, Lyricon
 Tom Schuman – keyboards
 Julio Fernández – guitars
 Kim Stone – bass guitar, double bass
 Richie Morales – drums
 Gerardo Velez – percussion
 Dave Samuels – marimba, vibraphone

Production 
 Jay Beckenstein – producer 
 Richard Calandra – producer
 Jeremy Wall – co-producer
 Larry Swist – engineer 
 Rick Begin – assistant engineer
 John Penzotti – assistant engineer
 Bob Ludwig – mastering at Masterdisk (New York City, New York).
 Jeff Adamoff – art direction 
 Steele Works – design
 William Coupon – band photography 
 NASA – courtesy front cover photography

References 

1985 albums
Spyro Gyra albums
MCA Records albums